The Democratic Independent Party is a minor South African political party. It formed in 2016 by Anwar Adams, shortly before the 2016 South African municipal elections, winning one seat in the City of Cape Town. Adams was previously a Pan Africanist Congress of Azania councillor.

The party is contesting the 2021 South African municipal elections, focusing on homelessness and housing. Besides Cape Town, it is also contesting the Cederberg Local Municipality, with former Democratic Alliance councillor and speaker Banjamin Zass as mayoral candidate.

Election results

Municipal elections

References

Political parties established in 2016
Political parties in South Africa